Mad Tea Party is a spinning tea cup ride at five of the six Disneyland-style theme parks around the world. The ride theme is inspired by the Unbirthday Party scene in Walt Disney's Alice In Wonderland, and plays a carousel version of the film's "Unbirthday Song". It was one of the opening day attractions operating at Disneyland on July 17, 1955.

The attraction is called Mad Tea Party at Disneyland and the Magic Kingdom. It is known as Alice's Tea Party at Tokyo Disneyland, Mad Hatter's Tea Cups at Disneyland Paris, and Mad Hatter Tea Cups at Hong Kong Disneyland.

All five versions of the attraction are located in Fantasyland, and all except the Tokyo version were opening-day attractions at their respective parks. The Disneyland, Disneyland Paris, and Hong Kong Disneyland versions do not have a big teapot in the center of the ride platform. The ride has gained infamy over the years for the number of guests who get motion sickness as a result of the spinning component to the ride.

Like Dumbo the Flying Elephant, Disneyland and its Hong Kong counterpart have a replica of one of the teacups located outside the attraction to be used by guests for better photo opportunities.

Attraction facts

 Ride system: Three small turntables, which rotate clockwise, each holding six teacups, within one large turntable, rotating counter-clockwise
 Theming: The Dormouse can be seen popping his head out of a large teapot in the middle of the large turntable. This occurs only at Magic Kingdom and Tokyo Disneyland, as the other parks do not feature a central teapot;  Hong Kong Disneyland and the March Hare Refreshments at Disneyland Paris feature their own teapots apart from the ride.
 Restrictions: The original attraction at Disneyland is unable to run in the rain because once the turntables are saturated with a moderate amount of water, they slip and can no longer spin.  The other versions of this attraction at Magic Kingdom, Tokyo Disneyland, Disneyland Paris, and Hong Kong Disneyland are covered to prevent such situations, as well as to protect riders from extreme heat and sun. Unlike its Magic Kingdom, Tokyo Disneyland, and Hong Kong Disneyland counterparts, the Disneyland Paris version has a petal-shaped glass roof.

History

Disneyland
Several concepts for the Mad Tea Party were originally much more outrageous compared to today's version. One drawing showed the Mad Hatter's dinner table featured in the center of the ride with various lanterns and decorations all around. Another drawing showed 20 teacups circling a central hub, making it similar to a racetrack with banked curves.

For the first few months after the ride first opened, the tea cups spun on a bare platform before it was painted with the psychedelic spiral that exists today. Also, during the ride's first two years, the tea cups had no brakes or clutches; nothing limited how fast they could be spun.

The attraction's original location was directly behind King Arthur Carrousel and Sleeping Beauty Castle. It was given slight modifications in 1972 with ornamental arches connecting the light posts, and again in 1978 with the platform and teacups being repainted. In 1983, the whole attraction was completely remodeled and relocated to its present location near Matterhorn Bobsleds. It also incorporated a few ideas from the original concepts, such as colorful lanterns.

In 2004, the attraction was modified to make it more difficult to spin fast after a disabled rider lost his balance and slipped from a teacup. Like other remaining 1955 attractions, one of Disneyland's teacups was painted gold in honor of the park's 50th anniversary in 2005.

The installation at Disneyland was manufactured by Arrow Development.

In 1956, the ride was paired with a nearby gift shop, called the "Mad Hatter of Fantasyland"; when the Alice in Wonderland attraction was built in 1958, the store was moved closer to both rides, creating an Alice corner. One of the teacups is positioned outside the hat store, for photo opportunities.

Magic Kingdom

Like Disneyland, Magic Kingdom's original 1971 version of this attraction opened without a roof. It was eventually added in 1973 (along with the central teapot) due to extreme weather conditions. It was updated in 1992 with a new color scheme, new music, and the colorful lanterns. In 2010, the canopy was repainted.

Disneyland Paris
The Paris version of the attraction is the only version to feature a petal-shaped glass roof and surrounding gardens. It also uses the Dormouse's teapot outside the ride, near the March Hare's Refreshments. The teacup designs were later used for Tokyo Disneyland and Hong Kong Disneyland's teacups.

See also
 
 List of Disneyland attractions

References

External links
Disneyland - Mad Tea Party
Magic Kingdom - Mad Tea Party
Tokyo Disneyland - Alice's Tea Party
Disneyland Paris - Mad Hatter Tea Cups
Hong Kong Disneyland - Mad Hatter Tea Cups

Amusement rides introduced in 1955
Amusement rides introduced in 1971
Amusement rides introduced in 1986
Amusement rides introduced in 1992
Amusement rides introduced in 2005
Amusement rides manufactured by Arrow Dynamics
Walt Disney Parks and Resorts attractions
Disneyland
Magic Kingdom
Tokyo Disneyland
Disneyland Park (Paris)
Hong Kong Disneyland
Attractions based on Alice in Wonderland
Fantasyland
Alice in Wonderland (franchise)
1955 establishments in California
1971 establishments in Florida
1986 establishments in Japan
1992 establishments in France
2005 establishments in Hong Kong